Ernest Wilson (31 March 1877 – 13 July 1959) was a New Zealand cricketer. He played one first-class match for Otago in 1927/28.

See also
 List of Otago representative cricketers

References

External links
 

1877 births
1959 deaths
New Zealand cricketers
Otago cricketers
Cricketers from Dunedin